Come Around may refer to:

Albums
 Come Around (Carla dal Forno album) or the title song, 2022
 Come Around (Sing It Loud album) or the title song, 2008
 Come Around, by Rob Lutes, 2021
 Come Around, by Tony Scherr, 2002
 Come Around EP, by Sing It Loud, 2008

Songs
 "Come Around" (Chantay Savage song), 1999
 "Come Around" (Counting Crows song), 2008
 "Come Around" (Mental As Anything song), 1980
 "Come Around" (Papa Roach song), 2019
 "Come Around", by Christian French and Hoodie Allen, 2019
 "Come Around", by Collie Buddz from Collie Buddz, 2007
 "Come Around", by Dōs of Soul from the Nutty Professor soundtrack album, 1996
 "Come Around", by Fireworks from All I Have to Offer Is My Own Confusion, 2009
 "Come Around", by the Foreign Exchange from Connected, 2004
 "Come Around", by Matt Blxck, competing to represent Malta in the Eurovision Song Contest 2022
 "Come Around", by Skip Bifferty from Skip Bifferty, 1968
 "Come Around", by Stars Go Dim, 2009
 "Come Around", by Timebelle, 2017
 "Come Around", by Transplants from In a Warzone, 2013

Other uses
 Come-around, a type of shot in curling

See also